Long may refer to:

Measurement
 Long, characteristic of something of great duration
 Long, characteristic of something of great length
 Longa (music), note value in early music mensural notation

Places

Asia
 Long District, Laos
 Long District, Phrae, Thailand
 Longjiang (disambiguation) or River Long (lit. "dragon river"), one of several rivers in China
 Yangtze River or Changjiang (lit. "Long River"), China

Elsewhere
 Long, Somme, France
 Long, Washington, United States

People
 Long (surname)
 Long (surname 龍) (Chinese surname)

Fictional characters
 Long (Bloody Roar), in the video game series

Sports
 Long, a fielding term in cricket
 Long, in tennis and similar games, beyond the service line during a serve and beyond the baseline during play

Other uses
 , a U.S. Navy ship name
 Long (finance), a position in finance, especially stock markets
 Lòng, name for a laneway in Shanghai
 Lóng, pinyin transliteration of 龍 or 龙, the Chinese characters for "Chinese dragon"

See also

 

 Length (disambiguation)
 Long County (disambiguation)
 Long Island (disambiguation)
 Long Lake (disambiguation)
 Long Mountain (disambiguation)
 Justice Long (disambiguation)
 "Long, Long, Long", a 1968 song by The Beatles
 Long long, a type of integer data type in computing
 Longleng a district of Phom people in Nagaland, India
 Short (disambiguation)